Arthur John Smith (27 October 1911 – 7 June 1975) was a Welsh footballer and football manager. He played as a full-back for Wolverhampton Wanderers, Bristol Rovers, Swindon Town and Chelsea.

During the Second World War, Smith was stationed in the Midlands and guested for West Bromwich Albion. His career was cut short when a bus ran over his foot during a blackout in Wolverhampton.

In 1948, he became West Bromwich Albion's first full-time manager and went on to manage Reading and Hyde United.

References

External links
 (West Bromwich Albion)
 (Reading, listed as Arthur Smith)
Jack Smith at Stamford-Bridge.com

1911 births
1975 deaths
Footballers from Merthyr Tydfil
Welsh footballers
Welsh football managers
Association football fullbacks
Wolverhampton Wanderers F.C. players
Bristol Rovers F.C. players
Swindon Town F.C. players
Chelsea F.C. players
West Bromwich Albion F.C. wartime guest players
Reading F.C. managers
West Bromwich Albion F.C. managers